The Rio International Open Jiu-Jitsu Championship is a contest realized annually since 2008, in Tijuca Tênis Clube, in Rio de Janeiro. The event is open to all society. This championship occurs simultaneously to Master and seniors international jiu-jitsu championship.

Categories 
Belts: White, Blue, Purple, Brown, Black,  - Male and female.
The age is evaluated as the one the athlete completes in the year of the contest.
 Juvenile: 16 to 17 years old
 Adult: 18 to 29 years old

Results

Available information 
Since 2008, CBJJ has broadcast the general result by teams.

2008 
 1- Alliance
 2- Check Matt
 3- UGF

2009 
 1- Alliance
 2- Checkmat BJJ
 3- GF Team

2010 
 1- Gracie Barra
 2- Nova União
 3- Gracie Humaita

2011 
 1 - GF Team 
 2 - Nova União 
 3 - Gracie Humaitá

References

See also 
 Jujutsu
 Brazilian Jiu-Jitsu
 Martial arts

Brazilian jiu-jitsu competitions
Sports competitions in Rio de Janeiro (city)